Palmetto Estates is an unincorporated area and census-designated place (CDP) in Miami-Dade County, Florida, United States. The population was 13,498 at the 2020 census.

Geography
It is bordered to the east by the village of Palmetto Bay. It is otherwise bordered by unincorporated communities: Kendal and Richmond Heights to the north, and West Perrine to the south. The western border is the Homestead Extension of Florida's Turnpike. U.S. Route 1 (Dixie Highway) runs along the eastern border.

Demographics

2020 census

As of the 2020 United States census, there were 13,498 people, 3,881 households, and 3,176 families residing in the CDP.

2000 census
As of the census of 2000, there were 13,675 people, 4,054 households, and 3,344 families residing in the CDP. The racial makeup of the CDP was 37.68% White (16.9% were Non-Hispanic White,) 48.77% African American, 0.21% Native American, 3.06% Asian, 0.01% Pacific Islander, 4.82% from other races, and 5.44% from two or more races. Hispanic or Latino of any race were 28.91% of the population.

There were 4,054 households, out of which 45.8% had children under the age of 18 living with them, 55.9% were married couples living together, 20.7% had a female householder with no husband present, and 17.5% were non-families. 13.7% of all households were made up of individuals, and 3.5% had someone living alone who was 65 years of age or older.  The average household size was 3.35 and the average family size was 3.66.

In the CDP, the population was spread out, with 31.2% under the age of 18, 9.1% from 18 to 24, 30.2% from 25 to 44, 22.1% from 45 to 64, and 7.5% who were 65 years of age or older.  The median age was 33 years. For every 100 females, there were 92.6 males.  For every 100 females age 18 and over, there were 88.8 males.

The median income for a household in the CDP was $48,338, and the median income for a family was $49,565. Males had a median income of $31,440 versus $26,921 for females. The per capita income for the CDP was $16,701.  About 7.8% of families and 10.9% of the population were below the poverty line, including 13.3% of those under age 18 and 11.7% of those age 65 or over.

As of 2000, speakers of English as a first language accounted for 65.94% of residents, while Spanish made up 29.75%, French Creole was at 2.08%, and French was the mother tongue of 0.88% of the population.

References

Census-designated places in Miami-Dade County, Florida
Census-designated places in Florida